Lafontaine, French for "the fountain", may refer to:

People
 August Lafontaine (1758–1831), German Writer
 De Lafontaine (1655–1738) French dancer
 Georg Wilhelm Lafontaine (1680–1745) German painter
 Jean de La Fontaine (1621-1695) French fabulist and one of the most widely read French poets of the 17th century
 Lafontaine a pseudonym of Albert Millaud (1844-1892), French journalist, writer and playwright
 Ludolph Lafontaine (1704–1774) German painter
 Oskar Lafontaine (born 1943) German politician

Places
 Lafontaine, Ontario, Canada
 Lafontaine, Quebec, Canada
 LaFontaine, a provincial electoral district in Quebec, Canada
 Lafontaine, Kansas, U.S.
 La Fontaine, Indiana, U.S.

Other uses
 Lafontaine (electoral district), a former riding in Quebec, Canada
 Lafontaine (surname)
 Lafontaine Bellot, governor of Plaisance, Newfoundland from 1664 to 1667
 5780 Lafontaine, a minor planet
 Hotel LaFontaine, Huntington, Indiana

See also
 La Fontaine (disambiguation)
 Fountain (disambiguation)